Tetrarhodium dodecacarbonyl is the chemical compound with the formula Rh4(CO)12.  This dark-red crystalline solid is the smallest binary rhodium carbonyl that can be handled as a solid under ambient conditions.  It is used as a catalyst in organic synthesis.

Structure, synthesis, reactions
According to X-ray crystallography,  features a tetrahedral array of four Rh atoms with nine terminal CO ligands and three bridging CO ligands.  The structure can be expressed as Rh4(CO)9(µ-CO)3.

  is prepared by treatment of an aqueous solution of  rhodium trichloride with activated copper metal under an atmosphere of CO.

4 RhCl3(H2O)3   +   8 Cu   +   22 CO   →       +   2 CO2   +   8 Cu(CO)Cl   +   4 HCl   +   10 H2O

Alternatively, the compound can be prepared by treatment of a methanolic solution of RhCl3(H2O)3 with CO to afford H[RhCl2(CO)2], followed by carbonylation in the presence of sodium citrate.

The cluster undergoes thermal substitution with phosphine ligands, L:
Rh4(CO)12-n   +   n L   →   Rh4(CO)12-nLn   +   n CO

Tetrarhodium dodecacarbonyl quantitatively decomposes in boiling hexane to afford hexadecacarbonylhexarhodium:

Related metal carbonyls
Because of their relevance to hydroformylation catalysis, rhodium carbonyls have been systematically studied to a high degree. The instability of Rh2(CO)8 has been a source of curiosity.  The analogous binary carbonyl of cobalt, Co2(CO)8, is well known.  Solutions of Rh4(CO)12 under high pressures of CO convert to the dirhodium compound:

 + 4 CO →

Unlike Co2(CO)8 which features bridging carbonyls, the main isomer of Rh2(CO)8 features only terminal CO ligands.  The relative instability of Rh2(CO)8 is analogous to the tendency of Ru(CO)5 to convert to Ru3(CO)12.

References

General reading
 King, R. B., "Rhodium: Organometallic Chemistry" Encyclopedia of Inorganic Chemistry 1994, 7, 3494.

Organorhodium compounds
Carbonyl complexes
Chemical compounds containing metal–metal bonds